The Tale of Sweeney Todd is a 1997 American crime-drama/horror television film directed by John Schlesinger and starring Ben Kingsley and Joanna Lumley. The teleplay by Peter Buckman was adapted from a story by Peter Shaw. It was broadcast in the United States by Showtime on April 19, 1998, and released on videotape in France the following month. It later was released as a feature film in select foreign markets.

Plot
Set in 18th Century London, the story focuses on Sweeney Todd (Ben Kingsley), a murderous barber whose business provides him with two profitable sidelines, the sale of his victims' jewelry and the disposal of their bodies to his mistress Mrs. Lovett (Joanna Lumley), who uses them to prepare meat pies for her unsuspecting clientele.

American Ben Carlyle (Campbell Scott) arrives in the city to track down wealthy diamond merchant Alfred Mannheim and $50,000 worth of diamonds he had sold to Carlyle's employers but failed to deliver. Mannheim's staff advises Carlyle that their boss disappeared without a trace weeks earlier, and he posts notices offering a reward for information leading to Mannheim's discovery.

Charlie (Sean Flanagan), a mute orphan who works as an assistant to Todd, recognizes Mannheim as a man the barber had shaved just prior to his disappearance. Realizing his dastardly deeds are in danger of being revealed, Todd imprisons the boy in his basement.

Meanwhile, Carlyle is seeking the assistance of the corrupt local police and an amiable serving wench named Alice, who happens to be Todd's ward, with his quest. When his suspicions about the ingredients of Mrs. Lovett's pies are all but confirmed by a chemist, he hides himself in a burlap sack and has himself deposited in her pie shop cellar with a delivery of meat. There he makes a gruesome discovery that spurs him to confront Mrs. Lovett, who tries to kill him but is knocked out and left to hang on a meat rack. Shortly after, she is arrested.

Carlyle then heads over to the barber shop to confront Todd, who overpowers and binds him. As he prepares his instruments to torture Carlyle to death, he explains what led him to a life of murder and cannibalism. Charlie, who has managed to free himself from his shackles, stabs Todd in the back, killing him. He then frees Carlyle, who sets the building on fire before escaping with the boy. Charlie gives Carlyle the keys to the safe.

Cast
 Ben Kingsley as Sweeney Todd
 Joanna Lumley as Mrs. Lovett
 Campbell Scott as Ben Carlyle
 Selina Boyack as Alice
 David Wilmot as Tom
 Sean Flanagan as Charlie
 Katharine Schlesinger as Lucy
 John Kavanagh as Rutledge
 Joe Savino as Chambers
 Niall Buggy as Vicar 
 Peter Jeffrey as Dr. Maxwell
 Peter Woodthorpe as Mannheim

Production
The character of Sweeney Todd, the Demon Barber of Fleet Street, originated in an 1846–47 penny dreadful entitled The String of Pearls. In 1847, George Dibdin Pitt adapted the story for a stage melodrama. A 1936 British film directed by George King was the first screen version. Christopher Bond's 1973 stage adaptation was musicalized by Stephen Sondheim in 1979. Schlesinger's film is a dramatic departure from the previous narratives. It dispenses with all the characters except Todd and Lovett, adds the plotline involving the missing diamonds, and offers a completely different reason for Todd's murder spree.

The Georgian era locales were filmed in Dublin, Ireland.

Prior to broadcast, the film had its world premiere at the Hamptons International Film Festival in October 1997.

Critical reception
In his review in New York, John Leonard said, "Much as I’d have imagined that yet another version of The Tale of Sweeney Todd would be at best inadvisable, Kingsley... is a class-war wonder to behold... Even more of a surprise than Kingsley’s performance is that director John Schlesinger, so very serious in movies like Midnight Cowboy and Marathon Man, would have so much fun with this blackest of humors."

Daryl Miller of the Los Angeles Times stated, "It is made of seemingly high-quality elements . . . yet it falls flat because of an ill-conceived script and directorial miscalculation."

Awards and nominations
Ben Kingsley was nominated for the Screen Actors Guild Award for Outstanding Performance by a Male Actor in a Miniseries or Television Movie but lost to Christopher Reeve for Rear Window.

Home media
The film was released on DVD in January 2008.

References

External links
 

Sweeney Todd
1997 television films
1997 films
1997 drama films
Irish television films
Films directed by John Schlesinger
Films scored by Richard Rodney Bennett
Films set in the 18th century
Films set in London
Films shot in Dublin (city)
1990s mystery films
American serial killer films
Showtime (TV network) original programming
American mystery films
American horror television films
Films with screenplays by Peter Buckman
1990s English-language films
1990s American films